OmVärlden is a Swedish online magazine based in Stockholm, Sweden, which focuses on global affairs and international politics. The magazine had a print edition until November 2014 when it went on online-only format. The magazine is financed by Sida, the Swedish Development Cooperation Agency, but fully independent with the editor-in-chief responsible under Swedish press laws.

History and profile
The magazine was established in 1970 under the name Rapport från Sida. In 1994 it was renamed OmVärlden. The Swedish International Development Cooperation Agency (Sida) was the owner of the magazine. The former publishers of the magazine were Global Reporting and Arenagruppen. Previously Erik Halkjaer, Anki Wood, Jesper Bengtsson served as the editor-in-chief of the magazine. Bengtsson was appointed to the post in 2010. Ylva Johnson and Jöran Hök also served as editors-in-chief. Swedish journalist Karin Alfredsson is among the former contributors. The magazine covers articles concerning global affairs and global development.

In November 2014 Sida announced that OmVärlden would go on online. Intellecta Corporate took over the magazine in January 2015. Erik Halkjaer was named the editor-in-chief of the magazine in 2015. In January 2016 Global Reporting once again took over the publishing of OmVärlden with Ylva Bergman as editor-in-chief between 2016–2020 and developed the journalism online with several noteworthy investigative reports, constructive journalism and multi dimensional perspectives that increased its reach by 180%.

References

External links
 

1970 establishments in Sweden
2014 disestablishments in Sweden
Defunct magazines published in Sweden
Defunct political magazines
Magazines established in 1970
Magazines disestablished in 2014
Magazines published in Stockholm
Online magazines with defunct print editions
Political magazines published in Sweden
Swedish-language magazines